Rybnoye is a town and the administrative center of Rybnovsky District in Ryazan Oblast, Russia, located on the Vozha River (Oka's tributary)  northwest of Ryazan, the administrative center of the oblast. Population:

History
It was first mentioned in 1597 as a settlement of Rybnino and was granted town status in 1961.

Administrative and municipal status
Within the framework of administrative divisions, Rybnoye serves as the administrative center of Rybnovsky District. As an administrative division, it is incorporated within Rybnovsky District as the town of district significance of Rybnoye. As a municipal division, the town of district significance of Rybnoye is incorporated within Rybnovsky Municipal District as Rybnovskoye Urban Settlement.

References

Notes

Sources

Cities and towns in Ryazan Oblast
Ryazansky Uyezd